This is a list of Sites of Community Importance in Valencian Community.

See also 
 List of Sites of Community Importance in Spain

References 
 Lisf of sites of community importance in Valencian Community

Valencian Community